Anhelina Kalinina was the defending champion but chose to participate at Wimbledon instead.

Oksana Selekhmeteva won the title, defeating Kateryna Baindl in the final, 6–3, 5–7, 7–5.

Seeds

Draw

Finals

Top half

Bottom half

References

External Links
Main Draw

Open International Féminin de Montpellier - Singles